"Could It Be I'm Falling in Love" is a 1972 song recorded by the American R&B vocal group The Spinners (known as "Detroit Spinners" in the UK). It was co-written by Melvin and Mervin Steals, two songwriter brothers working for Atlantic, who were sometimes credited as "Mystro and Lyric." It was produced by Thom Bell, recorded at Philadelphia's Sigma Sound Studios and the house band MFSB provided the backing. Bobby Smith sings lead through most of the song while Philippé Wynne handles vocal duties on the outro.

Released as the follow-up single to the group's first hit for Atlantic Records, "I'll Be Around," "Could It Be I'm Falling in Love" would equal the success of its predecessor, peaking at #1 on the R&B chart and #4 on the Billboard Pop Singles chart and selling over one million copies. The song also found success in the UK, peaking at #11 on the UK Singles Chart.

Reception
Pitchfork named it the 184th best song of the 1970s, saying "every time lead vocalist Smith is offered the opportunity to go loud, he goes soft, letting Bell's dulcet accompaniments do the singing for him. The '70s yielded countless songs about falling in love, but few are as blissful as this."

The Spinners version credits
Lead vocals by Bobby Smith and Philippé Wynne
Background vocals by Bobby Smith, Philippé Wynne, Pervis Jackson, Henry Fambrough and Billy Henderson
Additional Background vocals by Linda Creed and The Sweethearts of Sigma (Barbara Ingram, Carla Benson, and Evette Benton)
Instrumentation by MFSB

Chart performance

Weekly charts

Year-end charts

Trivia
This song was used on the soundtrack of the 2005 film Beauty Shop.

Cover versions
The song has been covered many times over the years, including a duet by David Grant and Jaki Graham (which peaked at #5 on the UK Singles Chart in 1985) and versions by Regina Belle, El Barrio, Messenjah, Worlds Apart, Peter White, Larry Carlton, Jeff Kashiwa, Donny Osmond, Earl Klugh, Boyz II Men, Todd Alsup, Houston Person and Paul Stanley.

References

External links
 

1972 songs
1972 singles
1985 singles
1994 singles
The Spinners (American group) songs
Atlantic Records singles
Cashbox number-one singles
Male–female vocal duets